Hula is a 1927 American silent romantic comedy film directed by Victor Fleming, and based on the novel Hula, a Romance of Hawaii (1927) by Armine von Tempski. The film stars Clara Bow and was released by Paramount Pictures. The film will fall into the public domain on January 1, 2023, because regardless of the film itself's renewal status, the copyright of the book it was based on was renewed in 1954.

Plot

Hula Calhoun (Clara Bow) is the daughter of a Hawaiian planter, Bill Calhoun (Albert Gran). She follows the advice of her uncle Edwin (Agostino Borgato), and follows a simple and natural life, far from social conventions of her family and is considered a "wild child" who wears pants and rides horses.

Courted with adoration by Harry Dehan (Arnold Kent), Hula prefers a young British engineer, Anthony Haldane (Clive Brook), who came to the island to oversee the construction of a dam on her father's property. However, Haldane is already married. At a party, Haldane tries to keep his distance but Hula gets drunk and performs a seductive hula dance for him. She manages to provoke him so much that he promises that he will get a divorce. When his wife, Margaret (Patricia Dupont), appears, Hula makes a deal with one of the foreman to use dynamite to blow up a point on the dam. Thinking that her husband is now ruined, Mrs. Haldane agrees to the divorce, and the two lovers can finally get married.

Cast
 Clara Bow as Hula Calhoun
 Clive Brook as Anthony Haldane
 Arlette Marchal as Mrs. Bane
 Albert Gran as Bill Calhoun
 Arnold Kent as Harry Dehan
 Patricia Dupont as Margaret Haldane
 Agostino Borgato as Uncle Edwin
 Duke Kahanamoku as Hawaiian boy

Production

In the opening scene of the film Hula is shown swimming nude in a stream, and later is wearing pants and articulates her sexual desires. Similar to Sadie Thompson (1928), the film depicts a modern woman who is located outside the bounds of American civilization and thus able to act in an "uncivilized" manner like natives who live on the islands.

See also
Nudity in film
The White Flower (1923)

References

External links

Stills  at the Walter Film Poster and Film Museum

1927 films
1927 romantic comedy films
American romantic comedy films
American silent feature films
American black-and-white films
Films based on American novels
Films directed by Victor Fleming
Films set in Hawaii
Paramount Pictures films
1920s English-language films
1920s American films
Silent romantic comedy films
Silent American comedy films